Major-General Sir Thomas Perrott  (5 March 1851 – 3 November 1919) was a British Army officer who commanded the Troops in the Straits Settlements.

Military career
Perrott was commissioned into the Royal Artillery in 1870. He was appointed Assistant Superintendent of Experiments at the School of Gunnery in 1885, Assistant Inspector of Warlike Stores in 1891 and Chief Instructor at the School of Gunnery in 1896. He served in the Second Boer War before reverting to the post of Chief Instructor at the School of Gunnery in 1902. He went on to be Colonel on the Staff of the Commander of the Royal Artillery at Thames District in 1904, Commander of the Royal Garrison Artillery at Thames and Medway Coast Defence in 1905 and Brigadier-General commanding the Scottish Coast Defences in 1906. He was made General Officer Commanding the Troops in the Straits Settlements in 1907 and Commander, Royal Artillery in Gibraltar in 1910 before retiring in 1913. He was recalled at the start of World War I as Inspector of Royal Horse Artillery and Royal Field Artillery in 1914 and retired again in 1915.

He died at Hambrook Grange near Chichester.

References

 

1851 births
1919 deaths
British Army generals of World War I
Royal Artillery officers
Knights Commander of the Order of the Bath
British Army personnel of the Second Boer War
British Army major generals